Stacy Awour Otieno (born September 27, 1990) is a Kenyan female rugby sevens player. She competed for the Kenya women's national rugby sevens team at the 2016 Summer Olympics. Otieno was also part of the Kenyan sevens team that made their debut in the World Rugby Women's Sevens Series at the 2016 France Women's Sevens.

References

External links 
 

1990 births
Living people
Female rugby sevens players
Rugby sevens players at the 2016 Summer Olympics
Olympic rugby sevens players of Kenya
Kenya international rugby sevens players
Kenya international women's rugby sevens players